55 Cancri is a binary star system located 41 light-years away from the Sun in the zodiac constellation of Cancer. It has the Bayer designation Rho1 Cancri (ρ1 Cancri); 55 Cancri is the Flamsteed designation (abbreviated 55 Cnc). The system consists of a K-type star (designated 55 Cancri A, also named Copernicus ) and a smaller red dwarf (55 Cancri B).

, five extrasolar planets (designated 55 Cancri b, c, d, e and f; named Galileo, Brahe, Lipperhey, Janssen and Harriot, respectively) are known to orbit 55 Cancri A.

Nomenclature
55 Cancri is the system's Flamsteed designation. It also bears the Bayer designation ρ1 Cancri (Latinised to Rho1 Cancri) and the Bright Star Catalogue designation HR 3522. The two components are designated A and B, though component A is sometimes referred to simply as 55 Cancri. The first planet discovered orbiting 55 Cancri A was designated HR 3522b by its discoverers, though it is more commonly referred to as 55 Cancri b. Under the rules for naming objects in binary star systems it should be named 55 Cancri Ab and this more formal form is occasionally used to avoid confusion with the secondary star 55 Cancri B. The other planets discovered were designated 55 Cancri c, d, e and f, in order of their discovery.

In July 2014 the International Astronomical Union launched NameExoWorlds, a process for giving proper names to certain exoplanets and their host stars. The process involved public nomination and voting for the new names. In December 2015, the IAU announced the winning names were Copernicus for 55 Cancri A and Galileo, Brahe, Lipperhey, Janssen and Harriot for its planets (b, c, d, e and f, respectively).

The winning names were those submitted by the Royal Netherlands Association for Meteorology and Astronomy of the Netherlands. They honor the astronomers Nicolaus Copernicus, Galileo Galilei, Tycho Brahe and Thomas Harriot and the spectacle makers and telescope pioneers Hans Lipperhey and Jacharias Janssen. (The IAU originally announced the winning name was Lippershey for 55 Cancri d. In January 2016, in recognition that his actual name was Lipperhey (with Lippershey an error introduced in the 19th century), the exoplanet name was corrected to Lipperhey by the IAU and that name was submitted to the official sites that keep track of astronomical information).

In 2016, the IAU organized a Working Group on Star Names (WGSN) to catalog and standardize proper names for stars. In its first bulletin of July 2016, the WGSN explicitly recognized the names of exoplanets and their host stars approved by the Executive Committee Working Group Public Naming of Planets and Planetary Satellites, including the names of stars adopted during the 2015 NameExoWorlds campaign. This star is now so entered in the IAU Catalog of Star Names.

Stellar system
The red dwarf 55 Cancri B is of the 13th magnitude and only visible through a telescope. Despite their wide separation, the two stars appear to be gravitationally bound, as they share a common proper motion.

The primary star, 55 Cancri A, has a spectral type of K0IV-V, indicating a main-sequence or subgiant star. It is smaller in radius and slightly less massive than the Sun, and so is cooler and less luminous. The star has only low emission from its chromosphere, and is not variable in the visible spectrum; but it is variable in X-rays. It is more enriched than the Sun in elements heavier than helium, with 186% the solar abundance of iron; it is therefore classified as a rare "super metal-rich" (SMR) star. 55 Cancri A also has more carbon than the Sun, with a C/O ratio of 0.78, compared to solar value of 0.55. This abundance of metal makes estimating the star's age and mass difficult, as evolutionary models are less well defined for such stars. 55 Cancri A is much older than the solar system, and its age has been estimated to values of 7.4–8.7 billion years or 10.2 ± 2.5 billion years.

A hypothesis for the high metal content in SMR dwarf stars is that material enriched in heavy elements fell into the atmosphere from a protoplanetary disk. This would pollute the star's external layers, resulting in a higher than normal metallicity. The lack of a deep convection zone would mean that the outer layers would retain higher abundance ratios of these heavy elements.

Observations of 55 Cancri A in the submillimeter region of the spectrum have thus far failed to detect any associated dust. The upper limit on emissions within  of this star is about 850 mJy, at a wavelength of 850 μm. This limits the total mass of fine dust around the star to less than 0.01% of the Earth's mass. However, this does not exclude the presence of an asteroid belt or a Kuiper belt equivalent.

The secondary, 55 Cancri B, is a red dwarf star much less massive and luminous than the Sun. There are indications that component B may itself be a double star, though this is uncertain.

Planetary system

The 55 Cancri system was the first known to have four, and later five, planets, and may possibly have more. The innermost planet, e, transits 55 Cancri A as viewed from Earth. The next planet, b, is non-transiting but there is tentative evidence that it is surrounded by an extended atmosphere that does transit the star.

In 1997, the discovery of a 51 Pegasi-like planet orbiting 55 Cancri A was announced, together with the planet of Tau Boötis and the inner planet of Upsilon Andromedae. The planet was discovered by measuring the star's radial velocity, which showed a periodicity of around 14.7 days corresponding to a planet at least 78% of the mass of Jupiter. These radial velocity measurements still showed a drift unaccounted for by this planet, which could be explained by the gravitational influence of a more distant object.

In 1998 the discovery of a possible dust disk around 55 Cancri A was announced. Calculations gave the disk radius at least 40 AU, similar to the Kuiper belt in the Solar System, with an inclination of 25° with respect to the plane of the sky. However, the discovery could not be verified and was later deemed to be spurious, caused instead by background galaxies.

After making further radial velocity measurements, a planet orbiting at a distance of around 5 AU was announced in 2002. This planet received the designation 55 Cancri d. At the time of discovery, the planet was thought to be in an orbit of mild eccentricity (close to 0.1), but this value was increased by later measurements. Even after accounting for these two planets, a periodicity at 43 days remained, possibly due to a third planet. Measurements of the star suggested that this was close to the star's rotation period, which raised the possibility that the 43-day signal was caused by stellar activity. This possible planet received the designation 55 Cancri c.

55 Cancri e was announced in 2004. With 8.3 Earth masses, it is a large super-Earth which was originally thought to have an orbital period of 2.8 days, though it was later found that this was an alias of its true period of 0.74 of a day by observations of e transiting in 2011. This planet was the first known instance of a fourth extrasolar planet in one system, and was the shortest-period planet until the discovery of PSR J1719−1438 b. The measurements that led to the discovery of this planet also confirmed the existence of 55 Cancri c.

In 2005, Jack Wisdom combined three data sets and drew two distinct conclusions: that the 2.8-day planet was an alias and that there was a Neptune-scale planet with a period near 261 days. Fischer et al. (2008) reported new observations that they said confirmed the existence of the 2.8-day planet, as first reported by McArthur et al. (2004), and a 260-day Neptune-sized planet, as first reported by Wisdom (2005). However, Dawson and Fabrycky (2010) concluded that the 2.8-day planet was indeed an alias, as suggested by Wisdom (2005), and that the correct period was 0.7365 of a day.

In 2007, Fisher et al. confirmed the existence of the 260-day planet proposed in 2005 by Wisdom. This planet, 55 Cancri f, was the first occurrence of a fifth extrasolar planet in one system. With a similar mass to c, it has a 260-day orbit, towards the inner edge of 55 Cancri A's habitable zone. The planet itself is not thought to be conducive to life, but hypothetical moons in principle could maintain at least water and life.

The planet e's eccentricity is poorly defined; varying values between 0 and 0.4 does not significantly improve the fit, so an eccentricity of 0.2 was assumed. Taking interactions between the planets into account results in a near-zero orbital eccentricity.

Astrometric observations with the Hubble Space Telescope measured an inclination of 53° of the outer planet d, though this result relies on the precise orbital parameters which have been substantially revised since this was published. The observed transits of e suggest an orbit normal inclined within 9° to the line-of-sight, and a possible detection of the transit of an extended atmosphere around 55 Cancri b would, if confirmed, imply that it too is in an orbit that is close to edge-on. Between them, no measurement of c's nor f's inclinations have been made. It had been thought that with five planets, the system cannot deviate far from coplanar in order to maintain stability. An attempt to measure the spin-orbit misalignment of the innermost planet reported that it was in a nearly polar orbit, but this interpretation of the data has since been challenged by a subsequent study, with noted inconsistencies between the implied and measured stellar rotation.

The approximate ratios of periods of adjacent orbits are (proceeding outward): 1:20, 1:3, 1:6, 1:20. The nearly 1:3 ratio between 55 Cancri b and c is apparently a near resonance, rather than a genuine mean motion resonance.

Between planets f and d, there appears to be a huge gap of distance where no planets are known to orbit. A 2008 paper found that as many as 3 additional planets of up to 50 times the mass of Earth could orbit at a distance of 0.9 to 3.8 AU from the star, and stable resonances of a hypothetical planet g with the known planets were found to be 3f:2g, 2g:1d, and 3g:2d. A study released in 2019 showed that undiscovered terrestrial planets may be able to orbit safely in this region at 1 to 2 AU; this space includes the outer limits of 55 Cancri's habitable Zone.
In 2021, it was found that terrestrial planets with comparable water content to Earth may have indeed been able to form and survive between the planets f and d.
As for the space outside d's orbit, its stability zone begins beyond 10 AU, though there is a stability zone between 8.6 and 9 AU due to a 2:1 resonance.

Communication
A METI message was sent to 55 Cancri. It was transmitted from Eurasia's largest radar—the  Evpatoria Planetary Radar. The message was named Cosmic Call 2; it was sent on July 6, 2003, and it will arrive at 55 Cancri in May 2044.

See also
 Sudarsky's gas giant classification
 Cancer in Chinese astronomy
 Kepler-186
 Lists of exoplanets
 Gliese 1132 b – rocky exoplanet with a confirmed atmosphere
 Mu Arae c – At constellation Ara
 Planetary system
 PSR B1257+12

References

Further reading

External links

 
 
 
 
 
 When the Gods Fall 55 Cancri in fiction.
 Extrasolar Planet Interactions by Rory Barnes & Richard Greenberg, Lunar and Planetary Lab, University of Arizona
 The First and the second part of a computer animation of the 55 Cancri planetary system.
 Interactive visualisation of the 55 Cancri system

 
Cancri, Rho1
Binary stars
Cancer (constellation)
Circumstellar disks
BD+28 1660
Cancri, 55
K-type main-sequence stars
Cancri, 55
0324
075732
043587
3522
Planetary systems with five confirmed planets
Planetary transit variables
2
K-type subgiants